Crataegus × media, is a hybrid between two species in the genus Crataegus (Hawthorn), C. monogyna and C. laevigata, both in series Crataegus. Under the rules of botanical nomenclature the name C. × media covers all intermediate forms between the two parent species, including backcrosses.

Horticulturally significant forms of C. × media include some with double pink or red flowers, including 'Paul's scarlet' and 'Rubra Plena'.

References

media
Hybrid plants